was a samurai and court official of Japan's Nara period. In 738 he became Sahyoe no suke (左兵衛佐 : Assistant Captain of the Left Division of Middle Palace Guards).

He was exiled to Mishima in Izu Province after aiding in the revolt of Fujiwara no Hirotsugu in 740 but was pardoned five years later. He was then made governor of Bizen Province, and an official of the Jibushō, the government department responsible for governing nobles above the fifth rank.

In 757, Azumabito was sentenced and executed for his involvement in a conspiracy organized by Tachibana no Naramaro.

Further reading
Papinot, Edmond (1910). Historical and geographical dictionary of Japan. Tokyo: Librarie Sansaisha.

References

Samurai
Kuge
757 deaths
Recipients of Japanese royal pardons
Executed Japanese people
People executed by Japan
8th-century executions
Year of birth unknown